Roberto Cortazar, his real name is Roberto Gomez Cortazar, (born 12 January 1962, in Mexico City), is a Mexican painter. He grew up in the southern state of Chiapas, Mexico. He lived in the popular Colonia Narvarte in Mexico City.

Academic training and activities
Roberto Cortazar commenced his academic training in 1976 at the National School of Arts and continued his academic studies at the National School of Painting and Sculpture, INBA known also as "La Esmeralda" with a grant from the National Institute of Fine Arts in Mexico. Later on, he collaborated with numerous academic institutions giving lectures, conferences, seminars, and advisory covering historic, philosophical, and theoretical aspects of art, including, being a key contributor to the renewal of the academic plan for the Mexican National School of Fine Arts. From 1989 to 1993, he was a founding member of the Consultative Council for the Mexican National Foundation for Culture and the Arts (CONACULTA). During these years, he was a juror for the National Plan for Creators and the National Fund for Plastic Arts.

Museum projects
2006–2008: "Saturn and the Parricides", presented at the Museo Amparo. The project explored the philosophical and moral roots of tyrnacids and parricides. Works were inspired in Greek mythology and a decomposition of the theme of Goya's "Saturn Devouring his Son". The itinerant exhibition would then travel to the main museums in Mexico, including the Museum of Contemporary art, which portrays a clear introduction to the project: "In the course of his art history studies, Cortázar came upon Francisco Goya's Saturn , which addresses the myth of the god who devoured all of his children to prevent them from overthrowing him. He later found a variation on the theme in the tyrannoktoni or Tyrannicides , the Athenian group of statues depicting a historical event: the murder of the tyrant Hipparcus by Aristogeiton and Harmodios. Musing over these works, he reached the conclusion that the history of art is far removed from the history of man, who writes the latter as a retelling of the battle to gain ascendancy over another, whereas art calls into question this exercise of power and plumbs the truth of human ideology". According to the curator: "In Cortázar's view, his characters' inner struggle is, likewise, the struggle that man must brave to achieve evolution, to cast off the primitive thirst for power that compelled Saturn to devour his children and drove Athenians to do away with Hipparcus".

2009: National Museum of Art. Cortazar was the first living artist invited by the Mexican National Museum of Art to exhibit by rendering a reinterpretation of one of Mexico's greatest masters: José Clemente Orozco. Roberto Cortazar was the first living artist to exhibit in the Museum as part of their programme to revisit and reinvigorate the museums great masters collection. His latest museum exhibition was held at the Museo Dolores Olmedo in Mexico City in 2011.

A critic's view
Edward M. Gomez, an art critic, who for has written for, among others, the New York Times, ARTnews, Art in America, Art & Antiques, Art + Auction, and the Japan Times, has followed Roberto Cortazar's career closely and has published several articles and a book on his work. In 1999, he wrote extensively of Cortazar's classical approach and meticulous technique.  In, 2009 Gomez participated in the publication of. In his Reinventing the Master: Cortazar's Variations on Orozco's Themes, Gomez writes "...Cortázar, whose art is rooted in Mexico’s long, rich tradition of figurative image-making (a tradition that stretches back to the region’s ancient civilizations), has never primarily been motivated by any theory or any aesthetic doctrines. Instead, the art-making language he has developed, with its unique blend of figurative and abstract elements, has evolved out of his technical experiments as a painter and draftsman, and out of his investigation and assimilation of a variety of influences, from the economical, expressive lines of such modern masters as Picasso and Matisse to the figure altering techniques of the Irish-born, British painter Francis Bacon. Like Bacon, who once remarked that "flesh is the reason oil painting was invented," Cortázar approaches and handles his materials in a way that is both elegant and visceral".

Art fairs
Roberto Cortazar has been a regular participant in art fairs, having been to over fifteen across the United States, Latin America, and Europe. He became almost a permanent fixture at Art Miami with Praxis Gallery, where he exhibited every year from 1994 to 2006, ten of these solo shows where his works were acquired by American and European collectors. He is quoted by Laura Meyers in her review of art gallerists as one of the "IT" artists that opened up Mexican contemporary art to the international fair scene. In 2006, Cortazar would draw himself from the commercial market to focus his production of two academic projects in collaboration with museums in Mexico.

Collections
Roberto Cortazar works are in public and private collections. He is one of the few contemporary artists for the National Heritage "La Coleccion". His early work from the 1990s, classically depicted images of the human body, have been particularly coveted. Eugenio Lopez Alonso bought a Cortazar as his first painting in 1990 and since has built Coleccion Jumex, one of the largest and most prominent collections in the world.

Publications
Los Desmembrados Según Orozco (Dismemberment according to Orozco). National Museum of Art. National Institute of Fine Arts Publishing, 2009.
"Saturn in the World of the Parricides". Mexico. Landucci, Editores, 2005.
Roberto Cortázar: 344 Figures and One in One Space. Gomez, Edward M. México. Landucci Editores, 2001.
Postmodernity and Romanticism. Roberto Cortázar. National Council for Culture and the Arts. National Institute of Fine Arts, 1995.

References

External links 
 Roberto Cortazar website
 The Arts: under Canvas from Conde Nast
 Roberto Cortazar's Atelier, YouTube

1962 births
Living people
People from Mexico City
Mexican painters